The Harrogate Bus Company operates both local and regional bus services in North Yorkshire and West Yorkshire, England. It is a subsidiary of Transdev Blazefield.

History
In November 1906, The Harrogate Road Car Company was formed. Initially operating steam-powered buses, the company adopted conventionally-fuelled petrol buses in 1911.

In 1924, the company was absorbed into Tilling & British Automobile Traction and renamed the Harrogate & District Road Car Company. Following the company's expansion, it was further renamed West Yorkshire Road Car Company in 1927, to reflect the wider service area provided.

In 1948, along with other companies that were then part of the Tilling Group, West Yorkshire Road Car Company was nationalised.

In 1968, West Yorkshire Road Car Company became a subsidiary of the National Bus Company.

In 1987, West Yorkshire Road Car Company was sold in a management buyout to the AJS Group, owned by former East Yorkshire Motor Services managing director, Alan Stephenson. The business was split into smaller companies in December 1988, one of which became Harrogate & District Transport.

Following the deregulation of bus services in 1986, Harrogate Independent Travel was set up by a number of West Yorkshire Road Car Company drivers, in a bid to challenge their former employer. The company was subsequently purchased by AJS Group in April 1989.

In August 1991, Harrogate & District Travel was included in the purchase of AJS Group by Blazefield Group, following the sale of seven of the company's eight remaining bus firms at the time – a deal valued at £2.2 million.

In October 1996, the company further expanded, following the transfer of Cowie Group's operations in the cathedral city of Ripon.

In April 2005, the company was awarded the contract to operate service 767, which ran between Harrogate and Leeds Bradford Airport. The contract was subsequently awarded to Dales & District in April 2010. The route is now served by the Flyer A2 service, operated by Transdev York & Country. It was introduced in September 2020, as part of a joint partnership between Leeds Bradford Airport, Transdev Blazefield and West Yorkshire Combined Authority.

In January 2006, French-based operator Transdev acquired the Blazefield Group, along with 305 vehicles.

In 2010, the company was rebranded under the name Transdev in Harrogate. As part of this, a new butterscotch and burgundy livery was introduced across the fleet, with the exception of the double-decker Wright Eclipse Gemini bodied Volvo B7TL vehicles dedicatedly branded for the company's Leeds to Harrogate and Ripon route 36, which received a revision to its original black, red and grey livery in 2009.

In 2011, the company became involved in a bus war with local independent operator, Connexionsbuses. It concerned bus services operating in and around the market town of Wetherby. In the same year, a retendering exercise by North Yorkshire County Council saw all of the company's council contracted routes transferred to other operators. An exception was service X59, which operated between Harrogate and Skipton via Bolton Abbey. Initially, the service was operated commercially and at a reduced frequency, prior to its eventual withdrawal in March 2013.

In 2012, 8 brand new single-decker Optare Versa vehicles entered service for use on the company's local services within Harrogate (2 to Bilton, 3 to Jennyfield, and the 6 to Pannal Ash), launching under a new brand name – Harrogate Connect. To coincide with this, during 2013, the rest of the fleet received the new revised version of the original butterscotch and burgundy livery – now coloured red and black – and all services (with the exception of dedicatedly branded route 36) began to operate under the Harrogate Connect identity. However, the double-decker Wright Eclipse Gemini bodied Volvo B7TL vehicles branded for the route 36 retained their own new black and red livery, which launched alongside the route's new brand identity – known as "36 City Connect" – in 2011.

In July 2016, the company was again rebranded, now operating as The Harrogate Bus Company. To coincide with this, a huge fleet upgrade was undertaken, which included the introduction of the current two-tone red livery, as well as a refurbishment of the company's route 1 branded single-deck Wright Eclipse Urban bodied Volvo B7RLE vehicles to set the new standard specification of free WiFi, USB charging capabilities and audio/visual next stop information. Other Wright Eclipse Urban vehicles were transferred from some of Transdev's other subsidiaries to replace the older Wright Renown bodied Volvo B10BLE single-decker vehicles which were branded for the route. 2016 also saw the launch of 14 new high-specification Wright Gemini 3 bodied Volvo B5TL double-deck vehicles on the route 36, replacing the older Wright Eclipse Gemini vehicles. The 36 also received its own new brand – "Riding Redefined" – as well as a new two-tone red and black livery. In July 2017, a new brand was introduced for the route 770/771, which saw the services become renumbered alongside the new brand name known as "Superior 70/71". A fleet of Wright Eclipse Urban 2 bodied Volvo B7RLE single-deck vehicles were transferred from Transdev's operations in Burnley and refurbished to equip them with WiFi, USB charging capabilities and audio/visual next stop information. The new fleet entered service on the route on the 23rd July, eventually replacing the entire fleet of Volvo B10BLE Wright Renown vehicles, which then left the fleet in 2018. In April 2018, due to the loss of council funding for the 70 to Connexionsbuses, the 71 was again renumbered and rebranded, now known as "Simple 7".

In partnership with DalesBus, the service between Harrogate and Skipton was reintroduced in May 2021 – the first direct service between the two towns for eight years. As of April 2022, four buses per day operate on summer Saturdays.

Services and branding

The Harrogate Bus Company 
Following the rebrand of the company in 2016, a two-tone red livery was introduced for local bus services in and around the spa town of Harrogate. As well as serving as a corporate livery, it is also used as a base for other route brands including Harrogate Electrics, The 1 (Knaresborough and Harrogate) and The 7 (Leeds, Wetherby and Harrogate).

Harrogate Electrics 
Local services operating in and around Harrogate are operated by a fleet of eight high-specification, fully-electric Volvo 7900 single-deck vehicles in dedicated branding. The vehicles, which were announced in February 2017, were introduced into service in July 2018. The project was funded partly by Transdev (£1.7 million), with a further £2.25 million of funding granted from the Government's Low Emission Bus Scheme. Features include free WiFi, USB charging and audio-visual next-stop announcements.

The Harrogate Electrics network encompasses the company's local routes within Harrogate – the 2 to Bilton, the 3 to Jennyfield, the 6 to Pannal Ash and the X6 to Beckwith Knowle Business Park. The 2 and 3 operate at a frequency of every 20 minutes, while the 6 operates every 30 minutes. The X6 service runs during weekdays at rush hour, operating 4 journeys from Harrogate during in the morning, and another 4 from Beckwith Knowle in the late afternoon/early evening.

The 1 
The 1 brand encompasses a group of routes (1, 1A, 1B, 1C and 1D), which operate between Harrogate and Knaresborough via Starbeck. Routes operate at a combined ten minute frequency between Harrogate and Knaresborough, with services extending at a reduced frequency to housing estates within Knaresborough – Aspin (1A), Eastfield (1B), Carmires (1C) and The Pastures (1D). The non-suffixed route 1 is curtailed to serve Harrogate and Starbeck only, and is used for buses leaving the company's depot in the early morning and returning in the evening.

Services are operated by a fleet of nine Wright Eclipse Urban bodied Volvo B7RLE single-deck vehicles, dedicatedly branded for the route in a two-tone red livery. Features include free WiFi, USB charging and audio-visual next-stop information.

The 7 
The 7 runs between Harrogate and Leeds via Wetherby, Boston Spa and Seacroft at an hourly frequency.

Services are operated by a fleet of seven Wright Eclipse Urban 2 bodied Volvo B7RLE single-deck vehicles, dedicatedly branded for the route in a two-tone red livery. Features include free WiFi, USB charging and audio-visual next stop information.

The 36 
The 36 is one of the group's flagship services, running between Leeds and Harrogate via Harewood up to every ten minutes, with three buses per hour extending to Ripon via Ripley.

Services are operated by a fleet of sixteen high-specification Wright Gemini 3 bodied Volvo B5TL double-deck vehicles, dedicatedly branded for the route in a two-tone black and red livery. Features include free WiFi, USB charging, coach-style seating with a 2+1 arrangement upstairs, an on-board library and audio-visual next stop information.

Sky Class X98/X99 
The X98/X99 is one of the group's flagship services. The X98 runs between Deighton Bar, Wetherby and Leeds via Collingham and Scarcroft during the day, while the X99 starts at Wetherby and in addition runs through Linton and East Keswick. Both routes each run every hour, which combined makes buses from Wetherby to Leeds run every 30 minutes.

Services are operated by a fleet of 4 Alexander Dennis Enviro400 MMC double-deck vehicles in the company's Sky Class specification, dedicatedly branded for the route in a two-tone silver and red livery. Features include free WiFi, USB and wireless charging, group seating with tables, individual seating upstairs, an on-board library and audio-visual next stop announcements.

Fleet and operations

Depots 
As of April 2022, the company operates from a single depot at Starbeck.

Vehicles 
As of March 2023, the fleet consists of 56 buses. The fleet consists of diesel-powered single and double-deck buses manufactured by Volvo and Alexander Dennis, as well as 8 Volvo 7900 Electric single-deck buses.

Notes

References

External links
 
 Transdev Blazefield Limited on Companies House 
 The Harrogate Bus Company website

Bus operators in North Yorkshire
Companies based in Harrogate
Transdev
Transport in Harrogate